Movie Night Out is an application for iOS and Android platforms, published by National CineMedia in 2010. The application allows users to organize an evening film viewing at a theatre as well as activities before and after the movie, such as dinner, coffee, dessert and shopping using a local data feed from Citysearch APIs.  The app features:
 A movie night out planner, with drag and drop customization, and categories such as nightlife, restaurants, coffee, dessert, flowers and more.
 Movie listings sorted by what's in theater now, coming soon movies and "Movies Now", which is movies playing closest to you, closest to the current time.
 Theater listings by closest to your proximity
 Various maps that showcase theaters and showtimes at theaters.

References

Mobile phone culture